Hallmann is a German surname. Notable people with the surname include:

Johannes Hallmann (born 1964), German agricultural scientist
Klemens Hallmann (born 1976), Austrian entrepreneur and investor
Piotr Hallmann (born 1987), Polish mixed martial artist

German-language surnames